The Railton Special, later rebuilt as the Railton Mobil Special, is a one-off motor vehicle designed by Reid Railton and built for John Cobb's successful attempts at the land speed record in 1938. 

It is currently on display at Thinktank, Birmingham Science Museum, England.

Design

The vehicle was powered by two supercharged Napier Lion VIID (WD) W-12 aircraft engines. Multiple engines was not a new technique, having already been used by the triple-engined White Triplex and the Railton Specials contemporary rival, Captain Eyston's twin-engined Thunderbolt. With the huge powers thus available, the limitation was in finding a transmission and tyres that could cope. Reid Railton found a simple and ingenious solution to this by simply splitting the drive from each engine to a separate axle, giving four wheel drive.

The National Physical Laboratory's wind tunnel was used for testing models of the body.

Land speed record

Further development
After the Second World War further development and sponsorship by Mobil Oil led to renaming as the Railton Mobil Special'. It was the first ground vehicle to break  in a measured test. On 16 September 1947 John Cobb averaged  over the measured mile in both directions (385.6 & 403.1) to take the world land speed record, before the American Goldenrod set a new mark for piston-engined, wheel-driven LSR cars eighteen years later.

Notes

Further reading

References

See also
Land speed record

Vehicles designed by Reid Railton
Vehicles powered by Napier Lion engines
Wheel-driven land speed record cars
1938 in motorsport
Cars powered by aircraft engines
Collection of Thinktank, Birmingham